Indians in Canada may refer to:

Indo-Canadians, Canadians of Indian descent
First Nations in Canada, indigenous peoples in Canada